Ardsley is a village in Westchester County, New York, United States. It is part of the town of Greenburgh. The village's population was 4,452 at the 2010 census. The mayor of Ardsley is Nancy Kaboolian.

The Ardsley post office serves the entire village of Ardsley, plus some nearby unincorporated sections of Greenburgh. The Ardsley Union Free School District includes the entire village of Ardsley plus parts of the village of Dobbs Ferry and unincorporated parts of Greenburgh. Ardsley has a library that is a member of the Westchester Library System.

Ardsley should not be confused with the nearby hamlet of Ardsley-on-Hudson, which is part of the village of Irvington.

History 

Prior to European settlement Ardsley and its surrounding area was inhabited by the Wickquasgeck tribe, a band of the Wappinger, related to the Lenape (Delaware) tribes which dominated lower New York state and New Jersey.

After the Dutch came to the area, the land was part of the Bisightick tract of the van der Donck grant purchased by Frederick Philipse in 1682, first lord of Philipsburg Manor.  In 1785 the state of New York confiscated the land from his Loyalist grandson, Frederick Philipse III, after he sided with the British in the American Revolution, and sold it to local farmers who had been tenants of the Phillipse family.

The village of Ashford was formed from some of these portions, named for the main road. Notable businesses included a blacksmith, and a sawmill and grist mill both situated upon the Saw Mill River. Three pickle factories were in operation by the Civil War, and in the 1880s the construction of the Putnam Railroad and New Croton Aqueduct led to a population boom which saw the installation of electric lighting and improved roads. 

Due to the presence of an earlier Ashford Post Office in New York state, the town was forced to change its name in order to receive its own.  The choice of "Ardsley" is attributed to Cyrus West Field, who owned  of land lying between Broadway (Dobbs Ferry) and Sprain Brook (Greenburgh) named Ardsley Park.  He had named his home Ardsley Park after the English birthplace of his immigrant ancestor, Zechariah Field (East Ardsley, West Riding of Yorkshire, England), who immigrated to the U.S. in 1629.  The story told at one time is that Field agreed to use his influence to get the post office established, and in return the village would be renamed Ardsley.  The first village postmaster was appointed in 1883.

Ardsley was incorporated as a town in 1896.  Ardsley High School was established in 1912, with an addition in 1925. The town would continue to grow at a steady pace until a fire destroyed the village center in 1914. This led to the reconstruction of several buildings, and the establishment of a fire department in the former schoolhouse. Two population booms would follow, the first between the end of World War I and the beginning of the Great Depression, and the second following World War II.  The Concord Road elementary school was built in 1953 with an addition in 1966. The town outgrew its original high school by the mid-1950s, resulting in the current facility being opened in 1957, and graduating its first class in 1958. The old school was converted into a middle school, until in 1971 the $5.5 million middle school was built.

The village was greatly changed during its second boom by the construction of the New York State Thruway in the late 1950s, which resulted in both the loss of the Ardsley station on the Putnam Division of the New York Central Railroad and the loss of much of the downtown business district.

Geography

The Saw Mill River and Sprain Brook are two waterways that run through Ardsley.  Over the years recurrent flooding along the Saw Mill River has caused damage to residential structures, commercial businesses, and industries as well as municipal infrastructure in Ardsley and other towns along the river. Recent severe floods occurred in March and April 1980, April 1984, and September 1999. The Army Corps of Engineers has completed several construction projects to help minimize potential damage from future floods in downtown Ardsley and surrounding areas.

Climate
The climate in this area is characterized by hot, humid summers and generally mild to cool winters. According to the Köppen Climate Classification system, Ardsley has a humid subtropical climate, abbreviated "Cfa" on climate maps.

It receives approximately 28 inches of snow per year.

Demographics

As of the census of 2000, there were 4,269 people, 1,432 households, and 1,212 families residing in the village. The racial makeup of the village was 84.00% White, 1.52% African American, 0.09% Native American, 12.34% Asian, 0.02% Pacific Islander, 0.73% from other races, and 1.29% from two or more races. Hispanic or Latino of any race were 4.26% of the population.

There were 1,432 households, out of which 43.5% had children under the age of 18 living with them, 75.1% were married couples living together, 7.5% had a female householder with no husband present, and 15.3% were non-families. 12.9% of all households were made up of individuals, and 7.0% had someone living alone who was 65 years of age or older. The average household size was 2.96 and the average family size was 3.22.

In the village, the population was spread out, with 27.9% under the age of 18, 4.5% from 18 to 24, 24.5% from 25 to 44, 27.8% from 45 to 64, and 15.3% who were 65 years of age or older. The median age was 42 years. For every 100 females there were 96.1 males. For every 100 females age 18 and over, there were 93.2 males.

The median income for a household in the village was $105,293, and the median income for a family was $126,239. Males had a median income of $88,012 versus $57,216 for females. The per capita income for the village was $47,086. About 0.4% of families and 1.3% of the population were below the poverty line, including 0.4% of those under age 18 and 3.8% of those age 65 or over.

Per the U.S. Census Bureau's 2018 estimates 4,534 people lived in the village. There were 1,688 housing units and the racial makeup of the village was 68.3% non-Hispanic white, 3.4% Black or African American, 0.2% American Indian or Alaska Native, 15.5% Asian, and 4.3% from two or more races. Hispanics or Latinos of any race made up 8.2% of the population.

Education
The Ardsley Union Free School District operates the village's public schools. Ardsley High School is the district's senior high school.

Lyceum Kennedy International School maintains its Ardsley campus, serving elementary grades.

Culture
In 2018 Brooke Lea Foster of The New York Times stated that it was one of several "Rivertowns" in New York State, even though physically Ardsley is not adjacent to a river; she described these "Rivertowns" as among the "least suburban of suburbs, each one celebrated by buyers there for its culture and hip factor, as much as the housing stock and sophisticated post-city life." Of those, Foster stated that Ardsley was "the most landlocked".

Infrastructure

Public transit 
The Bee-Line Bus System serves Ardsley with several lines.  Lines running north–south along Route 9A provide connections with Elmsford, White Plains, and Getty Square, Yonkers.  Lines running east–west provide connections to commuter rail stations and the downtowns of Dobbs Ferry, Scarsdale, Larchmont, and New Rochelle.

With the demise of the New York and Putnam Railroad, commuter rail service to New York City is available via the Dobbs Ferry train station and Ardsley-on-Hudson train station, served by Metro-North Railroad's Hudson Line, and the Hartsdale train station and Scarsdale train station served by Metro-North Railroad's Harlem Line.

Notable people

 Harold Goldsmith (1930–2004),  Olympic foil and épée fencer
 Jesse McCartney, singer, songwriter, and actor
 Timothy A. McDonnell, prelate of the Roman Catholic Church 
 Marshall Rogers, comics artist
 Mark Zuckerberg, founder of Facebook
 Funkmaster Flex, professional disc jockey

See also

 Ardsley High School
 Lyceum Kennedy

References

External links

 Village of Ardsley official website
Ardsley Historical Society official website

Greenburgh, New York
Villages in Westchester County, New York